Thomas Gil is a Spanish-born German philosopher, currently University Professor of Practical Philosophy at the Technical University of Berlin.

Born in Madrid (Spain) on Oct. 21, 1954, he   received his Ph.D. in philosophy from the University of Münster in 1981 and his Habilitation from the University of Stuttgart in 1992.

After having held teaching appointments as an assistant professor and as   associate professor at the University of Cologne and Stuttgart University  from 1985 till 1995, he became in 1995 full professor of philosophy    at the University of St. Gallen   and in 1996 the Chaïm Perelman Professor at the Free University of Brussels (Belgium).

Beginning in 1998, he has been  University Professor  at the Technical University of Berlin. He has also been visiting professor at the University of Murcia (Spain), at the City University of London and the State University of New York at Albany).
Gil is author of several books and articles on ethical judgments and normative structures, scientific research and practical reasoning, human action and rationality, in which he intends to clarify fundamental concepts human beings use to interpret natural reality and their own place in it, analytically examining the contexts in which specific arguments were developed and critically assessed in order to explain such concepts.

Selected publications  
 Ethik (Etica. Dalla polis greca alla società del rischio), 1993, .
 Demokratische Technikbewertung, 1999, . Kritik der klassischen Geschichtsphilosophie, 1999, . Die Rationalität des Handelns, 2003, . Die Praxis des Wissens, 2006, . Kritik des Empirismus, 2009, . Actions, Normativity, and History, 2010, . On Reasons, 2011, . Mind Functions, 2012, . Scientific Reasoning, 2012, . Die Kunst der Unterscheidung, 2013, .''

References

External links 
 Project ENGLOBE (Enlightment and Global History)
 Die Rationalität des Handelns
 Argumentiere. Argumente und ihr konkreter Gebrauch
 Seelenfunktion: Gedächtnis
 Über sich hinaus. Der Eigensinn religiöser Erfahrungen

1954 births
Living people
Academic staff of the Technical University of Berlin